Edward Alexander Mermelstein (born October 22, 1967) is New York City’s Commissioner for International Affairs. As head of the Mayor’s Office for International Affairs, he leads the office’s mission to serve as the primary liaison between the City of New York and the diplomatic community, consular corp, and the United Nations. Formerly, a Luxury Real Estate Consultant, Foreign Investment Advisor, Attorney at Law, Media Pundit and Developer based in New York City.

Mermelstein is the founder of several companies, including the One & Only Realty, its investment arm One & Only Holdings, and the corporate & international real estate law firm Rheem Bell & Mermelstein.

Early life 

Mermelstein was born to a Jewish family in 1967. In 1976, he emigrated to the United States and later attended the Bronx High School of Science. Mermelstein studied law at the Thomas Cooley Law School in the 1990's.

Career 
On January 2, 2022, Mermelstein joined the Eric Adams administration as the Commissioner of International Affairs in the Mayor’s Office.  Mermelstein has been a foreign investment advisor for more than 20 years, and assists wealthy foreigners with investments and acquisitions in the United States. Mermelstein has been quoted as an advocate of foreign direct investment in New York City, mainly because wealthy foreigners can achieve a glamorous lifestyle and top-notch education while investing in a moderate risk, stable economic environment with low interest rates.

Mermelstein's business endeavors are operated through One & Only Realty & One & Only Holdings, which specialize in the representation of foreign buyers in the acquisition of high-end properties worldwide, and provide family office planning services.

Mermelstein is also the founding partner of Rheem Bell & Mermelstein, a boutique New York City law firm specializing in complex real estate transactions and the resolution of international matters.

Mayor’s Office of International Affairs
On January 5, 2022 Mermelstein was named the commissioner of the Mayor’s Office of International Affairs by New York City Mayor Eric Adams.

News Media & Accomplishments 
Mermelstein is often quoted in news and on television.  He has appeared on networks such as CNBC, Fox Business Network, and Reuters in order to discuss foreign investments in the U.S. marketplace. He has been quoted in articles published by the New York Times, the Wall Street Journal the Financial Times, Reuters, and the New York Observer on topics spanning from price stabilization in the NYC luxury real estate market, to the status of foreign direct investment into the U.S. marketplace.  He has also contributed as a guest columnist with Forbes magazine,most  recently discussing the nuanced approach Chinese investors and the Chinese government are taking when it comes to investing overseas in major U.S. cities.

The New York Observer named Mermelstein as one of the top ten "Lawyers You Call" in New York, saying he was one of the "few real estate attorneys to successfully grow and sustain what could fairly be described as a global boutique firm" while speaking four languages and representing an "eclectic international clientele." He has been described as an "All Star attorney", and his abilities as a lawyer, consultant and developer have led to him being called a "power attorney" and a "certified triple threat in the real estate world."

Philanthropy
Mermelstein is the Chairman Emeritus of the Council of Jewish Émigré Community Organizations (COJECO), a central coordinating body in the Russian Jewish community that works with its member organizations and community leaders to accelerate the integration of the Russian-speaking Jewish community into American life and the larger Jewish community.

Mermelstein is a member of the Board of Overseers for the NYU Department of Arts & Sciences, whose mission is to create one of the handful of truly great arts and science schools in the world. Mermelstein also serves as a mentor to the Young Jewish Professionals Real Estate Network based in New York City.

Mermelstein is also President of the international search and rescue organization, ZAKA. ZAKA is a UN-recognized international rescue organization, that trains thousands of volunteers around the world to respond in times of major disaster. Guatemala's Secretary of Peace has awarded ZAKA volunteers with the honor of "Ambassador of Peace", thanks to their assistance and efforts towards the crisis in Guatemala, 2019. ZAKA has also been honored by UN Secretary General, Ban Ki-moon, in having him state that he "Commends ZAKA for their invaluable work in emergency settings across the globe"

In June 2019, Mermelstein was appointed to lead the 2019 Celebrate Israel Parade as its Grand Marshal, up 5th Avenue. The Parade is the largest public event celebrating Israel in the world highlighting Israel's rich heritage, vibrant culture, and the positive impact the Jewish and democratic state of Israel has on the lives of people around the world. Prior to the event ,Mermelstein stated that “As an immigrant New Yorker and a proud Jew, walking up Fifth Avenue as the grand marshal of the Celebrate Israel Parade is the pinnacle of the American dream "I am so proud to stand with Israel.”

Mermelstein is also a board member for JDC, knowns as The Joint. JDC strengthens communities in over 70 countries and aids areas in which are of need of help, bringing in traditional Jewish values.

Personal life
Mermelstein is married to actress, producer, and 4 time Tony winner Rose Caiola. Caiola is a former ballet dancer and founder of the Manhattan Youth Ballet and the Manhattan Movement and Arts Center, a New York City-based creative community conceived for the purpose of "allowing people of all ages and levels to explore dance and movement: for children to exercise their limitless curiosity and creativity; for young dancers to refine their technique and artistry; for choreographers and dancers to rehearse and develop their works, and for organizations and businesses to stage performances and special events in a refined setting."/

References

External links
 Edward A. Mermelstein & Associates
 Rheem, Bell & Mermelstein, LLP

1967 births
Living people
American lawyers
Western Michigan University Cooley Law School alumni
Soviet emigrants to the United States
American people of Ukrainian-Jewish descent
American real estate businesspeople